The swimming events of the 2009 Mediterranean Games were held at the Naiadi Swimming Complex in Pescara, Italy from Saturday 27 June to Wednesday 1 July 2009. Events were held in a long course (50 m) pool.

Medalist summary

Men's events

Legend:  

† Aschwin Wildeboer Faber set the 100 m backstroke world record in the lead-off leg with a time of 52.38 s.

Women's events

Legend:

Medal table

Source:

See also
2009 in swimming

References
Mediterranean Games Pescara 2009 Schedule and Results webpages

Sports at the 2009 Mediterranean Games
2009 in swimming
2009